The 1944 Argentine Film Critics Association Awards ceremony was held in Buenos Aires on 4 April 1944  to honour the best films and contributors to Argentine cinema in 1943.

Awards given
Best Film  (Mejor Película): Juvenilia 
Best Director  (Mejor Director): Augusto César Vatteone for Juvenilia
Best Actor  (Mejor Actor): Francisco Petrone for Todo un hombre
Best Actress  (Mejor Actriz): Mecha Ortiz for Safo, historia de una pasión
Best Supporting Actor  (Mejor Actor de Reparto): Eloy Álvarez for Juvenilia
Best Supporting Actress  (Mejor Actriz de Reparto): Leticia Scuri for Three Men of the River (Tres hombres del río)
Best Original Screenplay (Mejor Guión Original): Rodolfo González Pacheco, Hugo Mac Dougall, Eliseo Montaine for Three Men of the River 
Best Adapted Screenplay (Mejor Guión Adaptado): Pedro E. Pico, Manuel Agromayor, Alfredo de la Guardia for  Juvenilia
Best Cinematography (Mejor Fotografía): Francis Boeniger for Three Men of the River
Best Sound (Mejor Sonido): Alberto López for Dollhouse (Casa de muñecas)
Best Music (Mejor Music): Gilardo Gilardi for Three Men of the River
Best Camera Operator (Mejor Càmara): Leo Fleider for Three Men of the River 
Best Production Design (Mejor Escenografía): Gregorio López Naguil for Stella
Best Foreign Film (Mejor Película Extranjera): Noël Coward and David Lean's In Which We Serve (1942)

References

External links
1944 Argentinean Film Critics Association Awards at the Internet Movie Database

Argentine Film Critics Association Awards ceremonies
1944 in Argentina
1943 film awards